Mildred Iatrou Morgan is an American sound editor and audio engineer. She is of Greek descent.

Work 
Some of her works include:
 The Fast and the Furious (2001)
 Catch Me If You Can (2002)
 Antwone Fisher (2002)
 Sinbad: Legend of the Seven Seas (2003)
 The Terminal (2004), Hairspray (2007)
 Dawn of the Planet of the Apes (2011)
 Hitchcock (2012)
 Rise of the Planet of the Apes (2014)
 Wild (2014)
 La La Land (2016)
 First Man (2016)

For the critically acclaimed musical-drama La La Land she received a nomination for the Academy Award for Best Sound Editing (shared with Ai-Ling Lee) at the 89th Academy Awards. Together with Ai-Ling Lee, their nomination became the first female team to be nominated in the category.

Awards
 Nominated: Academy Award for Best Sound Editing
 Nominated: BAFTA Award for Best Sound
 Nominated: Satellite Award for Best Sound 
 Motion Picture Sound Editors Awards
 Nominated: Best Sound Editing - Dialogue and ADR in an English Language Feature - Dawn of the Planet of the Apes
 Nominated: Best Sound Editing - Dialogue and ADR in a Feature Film - Rise of the Planet of the Apes 
 Nominated: Best Sound Editing in Domestic Features - Dialogue & ADR - The Terminal 
 Nominated: Best Sound Editing in Feature Film - Animated - Sound - Sinbad: Legend of the Seven Seas 
 Nominated: Best Sound Editing in Domestic Features - Dialogue & ADR - Antwone Fisher
 Nominated: Best Sound Editing in Domestic Features - Dialogue & ADR - Catch Me If You Can 
 Nominated: Best Sound Editing - Dialogue & ADR, Domestic Feature Film - The Fast and the Furious

References

External links
 
 iatrouandmorgan.com

Living people
American audio engineers
Year of birth missing (living people)
Women audio engineers
Women sound editors
American sound editors
American people of Greek descent